"Addicted" is the first single by American rock band Saving Abel, which appeared on their self-titled debut studio album of the same name as the second track. The single was released in January 2008 through Virgin Records, and it was produced by Skidd Mills for Skiddo Music, LLC.

Certification and reception 
In November 2008, "Addicted" was certified Gold by the RIAA. It was also placed at #97 on Billboard's Top Hot 100 Hits of 2008.  It had at that point sold almost 800,000 copies and was well on its way to going platinum. Co-writer Skidd Mills won a BMI Pop Award for “most played song” for Saving Abel’s "Addicted."

On January 12, 2009, "Addicted" debuted at number 93 on the Australian ARIA Singles Chart, and later entered the top 50 at number 48. In the United States, it has reached number 20 on the Billboard Hot 100, becoming their first top-twenty hit. It was their only entry on either chart.

Music videos
There are two official music videos for this song.

The first video released, directed by Anthony Honn, is a video shoot for many models, including some of them topless and in other suggestive positions. There is also a clean (edited) version of the video.

The second video, directed by Steven Oritt, features the band playing the song along with a man in his house watching a woman through binoculars in her house as she swims, takes a bath and dresses for a night out. While she is getting dressed, the man watching her sees a figure in dark clothes sneak up to her door, and creep in without knocking. The man panics, puts down the binoculars and picks up his keys. He drives to her house, and knocks on the door. He is surprised to see the hooded man on the other side of the door, with the girl he'd been watching right behind him. Embarrassed, he says nothing while the couple leaves holding hands.

Charts and certifications

Weekly charts

Certifications

Year-end charts

Release history

References

2007 songs
2008 debut singles
Saving Abel songs
Virgin Records singles
Songs written by Skidd Mills